Stormartillerivagn m/43 (Sav m/43) was an assault gun based on Stridsvagn m/41 SII chassis, a Swedish development of a license-built Czechoslovak TNH medium tank. The Sav m/43 was first armed with a 75 mm gun; later they were rearmed with a 105 mm m/44 gun.

Service 
The Sav m/43 was used by the artillery in A9 Regiment at Kristinehamn. In 1951, they were transferred to the armored forces. With one Sav m/43 used in  training, they were allocated to infantry assault gun companies with six assault guns in each brigade. They were phased out of active service in 1973.

Notes

External links
 Swedish armor  – Web page dedicated to the Swedish armor.

Main battle tanks of the Cold War
Armoured fighting vehicles of Sweden
World War II assault guns
Military vehicles introduced from 1940 to 1944
Tracked self-propelled artillery